Harold Lawton "Harry" "Punch" Broadbent, MM (July 13, 1892 – March 6, 1971) was a Canadian ice hockey player. Broadbent played for the Ottawa Senators, Montreal Maroons and the New York Americans in the National Hockey Association (NHA) and National Hockey League (NHL) between 1912 and 1929. Broadbent won the Stanley Cup four times during his career, three times with Ottawa and once with Montreal. He is regarded as one of the first true power forwards in NHL history.

Personal life
Born in Ottawa, Ontario. Broadbent married Leda Fitzimmons and had one daughter, Sally Ann Broadbent. In the summer of 1915 Broadbent enlisted in the Canadian military to serve in the First World War. He served in the Royal Regiment of Canadian Artillery, and was promoted to Bombardier in October 1916. In March 1918 he was awarded the Military Medal for his service in the First World War.

A January 27, 1934 article on Broadbent in the Montreal Gazette by D. A. L. MacDonald says he was called "Punch" because of his round chubby face which would puff up like a Billiken charm doll when he smiled.

Playing career

Early in his career Broadbent played for amateur teams in the Ottawa region. He made his professional debut with the Ottawa Senators of the National Hockey Association (NHA) in 1912, being paired on a line with Jack Darragh. He was seventh in the league in scoring his rookie year, and while hobbled with injuries the next, was fourth in scoring the following year. He scored three goals in the Stanley Cup Final against the Vancouver Millionaires in 1915 before going to the war for three and one-half years.

Broadbent returned from the war in January 1919, and played the remaining 8 games of the season for the Senators, who had joined the National Hockey League in 1917. With forwards Frank Nighbor and Cy Denneny, he starred for the Senators for six more seasons, playing for three Stanley Cup champions. Though he was a holdout for most of the 1921 season, Broadbent came back to win the league scoring title in 1922, with 32 goals in 24 games. He also set a record that season by scoring goals in sixteen consecutive games. The streak began during a 10–0 rout of the Montreal Canadiens on December 24 and lasted through to a 6–6 tie with Canadiens on February 15, and it included a stretch of six straight multi-goal games.

In 1925, along with veteran teammate Clint Benedict, Broadbent was sold by Ottawa to the expansion Montreal Maroons. Broadbent was the Maroons' leading scorer that first season, including a five-goal game against the Hamilton Tigers. In his second season with the Maroons, the team won its first Stanley Cup championship against the Ottawa Senators. He was traded back to the Senators in 1928 with cash for Hooley Smith. He played for the New York Americans in 1929 and retired after that season.

Broadbent finished his career with 172 goals and 58 assists in 360 professional games. After his playing career, he coached for several years in the Ottawa City Hockey League, winning the championship in 1933 with the Ottawa Rideaus. He was elected to the Hockey Hall of Fame in 1962.

Career statistics

Regular season and playoffs

Awards and records
 NHL consecutive goal-scoring streak: 16 consecutive games
 NHL scoring leader: 1922
 Stanley Cup champion: 1920, 1921, 1923, 1926
 Elected to the Hockey Hall of Fame in 1962

Transactions
 January 21, 1919 – Signed as a free agent by Ottawa Senators.
 December 30, 1920 – Rights transferred to Hamilton Tigers from Ottawa Senators by NHL with Sprague Cleghorn. Both Broadbent and Cleghorn refused to report. 	  	
 January 4, 1921 – Rights traded to Montreal Canadiens by Hamilton Tigers for cash. Broadbent refused to report. 	  	
 February 21, 1921 – Rights returned to Ottawa Senators by NHL. 	  	
 October 20, 1924 – Traded to Montreal Maroons by Ottawa Senators with Clint Benedict for cash. 	  	
 October 7, 1927 – Traded to Ottawa Senators by Montreal Maroons with $22,500 for Hooley Smith. 	  	
 October 15, 1928 – Traded to New York Americans by Ottawa Senators for $10,000.
 January 1, 1929 – Fined $25 by NHL for trying to start a fight in the penalty box during game with Montreal Canadiens. 	  	
 October 31, 1929 – Announced retirement.

See also
 List of members of the Hockey Hall of Fame
 List of players with 5 or more goals in an NHL game

References

Notes

Bibliography

External links
 

1892 births
1971 deaths
Military personnel from Ottawa
Royal Regiment of Canadian Artillery personnel
Canadian ice hockey forwards
Canadian Expeditionary Force soldiers
Hockey Hall of Fame inductees
Ice hockey people from Ottawa
Montreal Maroons players
National Hockey League scoring leaders (prior to 1947–48)
New York Americans players
Ottawa Senators (1917) players
Ottawa Senators (NHA) players
Ottawa Senators (original) players
Canadian recipients of the Military Medal
Stanley Cup champions
Burials at Beechwood Cemetery (Ottawa)